Alan Dayton was former Deputy Mayor of Salt Lake County and Acting Mayor of Salt Lake County after the indictment of Nancy Workman.

Career
Dayton is a lawyer to the Utah Bar. He is currently Vice President of Government Relations for Intermountain Healthcare (IHC). He is credited with IHC's successful navigation of the Utah Legislature's health care task force. In 2000 Dayton was charged with a misdemeanor in Ogden for standing by the side of the road with a sign warning motorists of a speed trap. The charges against him were eventually dismissed on free speech grounds.

Personal life
Dayton's wife Kat Dayton is the head of the Political Action Committee for the Republicans in the Utah House of Representatives.

References

Living people
Mayors of Salt Lake County, Utah
Year of birth missing (living people)